Hypatopa dux is a moth in the family Blastobasidae. It is found in Costa Rica.

The length of the forewings is 5–5.6 mm. The forewings are brown intermixed with a few pale-brown scales. The hindwings are translucent pale brown, gradually darkening towards the apex.

Etymology
The specific name is derived from Latin mora (meaning a guide or conductor).

References

Moths described in 2013
Hypatopa